The 2012–13 Tercera División season is the fourth-tier football league of Mexico. The tournament began on 31 August 2012 and finished on 2 June 2013.

Competition format 
The Tercera División (Third Division) is divided into 14 groups. For the 2009/2010 season, the format of the tournament has been reorganized to a home and away format, which all teams will play in their respective group. The 14 groups consist of teams who are eligible to play in the liguilla de ascenso for one promotion spot, teams who are affiliated with teams in the Liga MX, Ascenso MX and Liga Premier, which are not eligible for promotion but will play that who the better filial team in an eight team filial playoff tournament for the entire season.

The league format allows participating franchises to rent their place to another team, so some clubs compete with a different name than the one registered with the FMF.

Group 1
Group with 9 teams from Campeche, Chiapas, Quintana Roo, Tabasco and Yucatán.

Teams

League table

Group 2
Group with 16 teams from Chiapas, Oaxaca and Veracruz.

Teams

League table

Group 3
Group with 17 teams from Guerrero, Morelos, Oaxaca, Puebla, State of Mexico and Veracruz.

Teams

League table

Group 4
Group with 17 teams from Greater Mexico City.

Teams

League table

Group 5
Group with 16 teams from Mexico City, Michoacán and State of Mexico.

Teams

League table

Group 6
Group with 16 teams from Hidalgo, Puebla, San Luis Potosí, State of Mexico and Tlaxcala.

Teams

League table

Group 7
Group with 16 teams from Greater Mexico City.

Teams

League table

Group 8
Group with 17 teams from Guanajuato, Guerrero, Michoacán and Querétaro.

Teams

League table

Group 9
Group with 18 teams from Aguascalientes, Guanajuato, Jalisco, Michoacán, San Luis Potosí and Zacatecas.

Teams

League table

Group 10
Group with 17 teams from Colima and Jalisco.

Teams

League table

Group 11
Group with 18 teams from Jalisco, Michoacán and Nayarit.

Teams

League table

Group 12
Group with 17 teams from Coahuila, Nuevo León, San Luis Potosí and Tamaulipas.

Teams

League table

Group 13
Group with 11 teams from Baja California, Sinaloa and Sonora.

Teams

League table

Group 14
Group with 9 teams from Chihuahua, Coahuila, Durango and Sonora.

Teams

League table

Promotion play-offs

Round of 64

Round of 32

Final stage

Round of 16

First leg

Second leg

Quarter-finals

First leg

Second leg

Semi-finals

First leg

Second leg

Final

First leg

Second leg

Reserve teams play–offs

See also 
Tercera División de México

References

External links 
 Official website of Liga TDP

Mx
1